The 16th Army was a World War II field army of the Wehrmacht.

History
It took part in the Battle of France. It was then deployed with Army Group North during Operation Barbarossa, the German invasion of the Soviet Union. It fought its way into northern Russia where in January 1942 part of it was encircled by the Soviets near Demyansk. Hitler forbade a withdrawal and the Army was re-supplied by air until a land corridor was opened in April 1942. It was subsequently involved in the Siege of Leningrad. The Soviets relieved Leningrad in January 1944.

On February 19, 1944, the Soviet 2nd Baltic Front launched a fresh set of attacks against the German 16th Army around Kholm. The Soviet 22nd Army made good progress in the initial assault. These attacks greatly diminished the 16th Army. It, along with the 18th Army was cut off in the Courland Peninsula when the Soviets launched their summer and autumn offensives of 1944. It stayed trapped there in the Courland Pocket  as part of Army Group Courland until the end of the war. In May 1945 the remnants of the army, now reduced to corps strength, capitulated to the Red Army and were marched into captivity.  The survivors were eventually repatriated in 1955.

Commanders

References

16
Military units and formations disestablished in 1945
Military units and formations established in 1939